Lieutenant General Jameel Mahmood, AVSM, ADC was a General Officer in the Indian Army. He served as the General Officer Commanding-in-Chief Eastern Command between October1992 and  May1993. Gen Mahmood was killed with his wife in an Mi-17 helicopter crash in Bhutan, while on an official visit.

Early life and education
He was born in Vikarabad in 1938 and was the brother-in-law of Lt Gen Mohammad Ahmed Zaki of the Indian Army. His son, Brigadier Ali Adil Mahmood is an armoured corps officer in the Indian Army, and was commandant of the President's Bodyguard regiment, prior to his promotion as Brigadier. He attended the Bishop Cotton Boys' School in Bangalore, India.

Military career
He was commissioned into the Regiment of Artillery in 1959 and commanded a platoon in Sikkim during the Sino-Indian War, winning a Yudh Seva Medal for his actions. He later served as an Artillery Battery Commander, Battalion GSO-1 and XO, and Instructor at the Indian Military Academy. He attended the Defence Services Staff College. He later commanded a Regiment in Ladakh after promotion to Colonel in 1977. He was promoted to Brigadier in 1983 and thereafter became the Chief of Logistics of an Infantry Division as well as commanding officer of an Infantry brigade under XIV Corps. He was later a staff officer under the Directorate General of Military Operations and deputy commander of the 1st Armoured Division (India). He was promoted to Major General in 1988, after which he was the General Officer Commanding of the 17 Infantry Division. He served for a time as the Deputy Commandant of the Army War College, Mhow, before being promoted as Lieutenant General in 1991. He was then the Commander of the XV Corps and then promoted to the Senior Grade of Lieutenant Generals in 1992 and appointed as the GOC-in-C of the Eastern Command. He was on trip to attend a social gathering of officers under the Dimapur Corps Headquarters when his Mi-17 helicopter ran into a mechanical failure after a thunderstorm and crashed, killing him, his wife, his MA Col MN Ahmed (who was also his brother in law) and Lieutenant Lakshman Tyagi, his orderly Naik G. Thyagarajan, his personal bodyguard Havildar S. Vasudevan, and the IAF crew manning the chopper.

His brother Major General Sultan Mahmood (retd) was in the Artillery and an alumnus of the 20th course of the National Defence Academy. His son Brigadier Adil Mahmood is an Armoured Corps officer having been commissioned into and commanded 16 Cavalry. Gen Jameel's grandfather had also served in the 16 Cavalry.

See also
 Hyderabadi Muslims
 Golkonda
 Hyderabad State
 Muslim culture of Hyderabad
 History of Hyderabad for a history of the city of Hyderabad.
 Hyderabad (India) for the city.

References

Indian Muslims
Indian generals
Military personnel from Hyderabad, India
Bishop Cotton Boys' School alumni
1938 births
Living people
Recipients of the Ati Vishisht Seva Medal
Academic staff of Army War College, Mhow
Defence Services Staff College alumni